Kalidos is a genus of air-breathing land snail, a terrestrial pulmonate gastropod mollusk in the subfamily Helicarioninae  of the family Helicarionidae.

Description
(Original description) The depressed shell is conoid. It is finely striated, and decussated by fine or coarse spirals. The periphery is rounded or angular. The umbilicus is small.

Distribution
This genus occurs in Madagascar.

Species 
Species within the genus Kalidos include:
 
 Kalidos aequivocus (Robson, 1914)
 Kalidos ambatoensis Emberton & Griffiths, 2009
 Kalidos ambilensis Fischer & Bedoucha, 1966
 Kalidos ambrae Emberton, 2007
 Kalidos amicus Fischer Blanc Salvat 1975
 Kalidos analamerae Emberton, 2007
 Kalidos anceyianus Fischer-P & Salvat, 1966
 Kalidos andapaensis Fischer Blanc Salvat, 1975
 Kalidos angulorchidus Emberton, 2007
 Kalidos anobrachis (Dohrn, 1882)
 Kalidos antsepokensis Fischer Blanc Vukad., 1974
 Kalidos avanalamerae Emberton, 2007
 Kalidos balstoni (Angas, 1877)
 Kalidos bathensis (Robson, 1914)
 Kalidos bathiei (Fischer-P & Salvat, 1965)
 Kalidos beambrae Emberton, 2007
 Kalidos benardi Fischer Blanc Salvat, 1994
 Kalidos betsaratae Emberton, 2007
 Kalidos boriambrae Emberton, 2007
 Kalidos bournei Robson, 1914
 Kalidos briandi Fischer Blanc Salvat, 1994
 Kalidos cachani Fischer Blanc Salvat, 1994
 Kalidos calculus Fischer & Bedoucha, 1966
 Kalidos capdambrae Emberton, 2007
 Kalidos capestensis Emberton & Griffiths, 2009
 Kalidos capuroni Fischer Blanc Salvat, 1975
 Kalidos chastellii (Ferussac, 1832)
 Kalidos cleamesi (Smith, 1882)
 Kalidos conorchidus Emberton, 2007
 Kalidos dautzenbergianus (Ancey, 1902)
 Kalidos decaryi Fischer Blanc Salvat, 1975
 Kalidos dupuyi Verdcourt, 2006
 Kalidos ekongensis (Angas, 1877)
 Kalidos etiambrae Emberton, 2007
 Kalidos eos (Dohrn, 1882)
 Kalidos eucharis (Deshayes, 1840)
 Kalidos fallax Fischer Blanc Salvat, 1975
 Kalidos feneriffensis (Adams & Angas, 1876)
 Kalidos fenni Emberton & Pearce, 2000
 Kalidos fisakambrae Emberton, 2007
 Kalidos fisakus Emberton, 2007
 Kalidos foitra Emberton, 2007
 Kalidos fuscoluteus (Grateloup, 1840)
 Kalidos gallorum Emberton, 2007
 Kalidos galokoae Emberton, 2007
 Kalidos germodi Fischer Blanc Salvat, 1994
 Kalidos gervaisi Fischer Blanc Salvat, 1994
 Kalidos ginoi (Falconieri, 1995)
 Kalidos glessi Fischer Blanc Salvat, 1975
 Kalidos globosus Emberton, 2007
 Kalidos gora Emberton et al., 2010
 Kalidos granosculptus (Ancey, 1902)
 Kalidos griffithshauchleri Emberton, 2002
 Kalidos guernesti Fischer Blanc Salvat, 1994
 Kalidos helleri Fischer Blanc Salvat, 1994
 Kalidos hildebrandti (Dohrn, 1882)
 Kalidos hova (Odhner, 1919)
 Kalidos humbloti (Ancey, 1902)
 Kalidos josephinae Emberton & Griffiths, 2009
 Kalidos ketronambrae Emberton, 2007
 Kalidos kosugei Falconieri, 1995
 Kalidos lamenni Fischer Blanc Salvat, 1994
 Kalidos lamyi Fischer & Bedoucha, 1966
 Kalidos lapillus Fischer & Bedoucha, 1966
 Kalidos liardi Fischer Blanc Salvat, 1994
 Kalidos loucoubeensis Fischer Blanc Salvat, 1994
 Kalidos luroni Fischer Blanc Salvat, 1994
 Kalidos mandamus Emberton, 2007
 Kalidos mangokyanus (Fischer-P & Salvat, 1965)
 Kalidos manotrika Emberton et al., 2010
 Kalidos manta Emberton et al., 2010
 Kalidos manumboensis Emberton, 1994
 Kalidos marojezianus Fischer Blanc Salvat, 1994
 Kalidos maryannae Griffiths & Herbert, 2013
 Kalidos matoatoa Emberton, 2007
 Kalidos menani Fischer Blanc Salvat, 1993
 Kalidos merschardti Fischer Blanc Salvat, 1975
 Kalidos microlamyi Fischer Blanc Vukad., 1974
 Kalidos milloti Fischer Blanc Salvat, 1966
 Kalidos minangulorchidus Emberton, 2007
 Kalidos minorchidus Emberton, 2007
 Kalidos montis Fischer & Bedoucha, 1966
 Kalidos minangulorchidus Emberton, 2007
 Kalidos minorchidus Emberton, 2007
 Kalidos nelamni Fischer Blanc Salvat, 1994
 Kalidos oleatus (Ancey, 1902)
 Kalidos orchidus Emberton, 2007
 Kalidos oxyacme (Ancey, 1902)
 Kalidos pendutsaratae Emberton, 2007
 Kalidos piperatus (Fulton, 1901)
 Kalidos platorchidus Emberton, 2007
 Kalidos prenanti Fischer Blanc Salvat, 1994
 Kalidos profugus (Ancey, 1902)
 Kalidos prominens Fischer-P & Salvat, 1966
 Kalidos propeanobrachis Fischer & Bedoucha, 1966
 Kalidos prunelli Fischer Blanc Salvat, 1994
 Kalidos ramesi Fischer Blanc Salvat, 1994
 Kalidos richardi Emberton & Pearce, 2000
 Kalidos rioui Fischer Blanc Salvat, 1994
 Kalidos rudolfi Fischer Blanc Salvat, 1994
 Kalidos rufescens (Grateloup, 1840)
 Kalidos secans Fischer Blanc Salvat, 1975
 Kalidos severini Fischer Blanc Salvat, 1994
 Kalidos striaspiralis Emberton & Pearce, 2000
 Kalidos suarezensis (Dautzenberg, 1894)
 Kalidos ternieri Fischer Blanc Salvat, 1994
 Kalidos thalia (Dohrn, 1882)
 Kalidos toisuarezensis Emberton, 2007
 Kalidos torfani Fischer Blanc Salvat, 1994
 Kalidos tranomarensis Fischer Blanc Vukad., 1974
 Kalidos tsarabe Emberton & Griffiths, 2009
 Kalidos tsaratananensis Fischer-P & Salvat, 1966
 Kalidos tsialangiensis Fischer Blanc Vukad., 1974
 Kalidos vasihae Emberton & Pearce, 2000
 Kalidos vavaboriborius Emberton, 2007
 Kalidos zahamenensis Fischer Blanc Salvat, 1994

Species broughht into synonymy
 Kalidos acutus Fischer-Piette & Salvat, 1966: synonym of Sitala acuta (Fischer-Piette & Salvat, 1966) (original combination)
 Kalidos culminis Fischer-Piette & Salvat, 1966: synonym of Sitala culminis (Fischer-Piette & Salvat, 1966) (original combination)
 Kalidos delphini Fischer-Piette, Blanc, F. & Vukadinovic, 1974: synonym of Sitala delphini (Fischer-Piette, Blanc, F. & Vukadinovic, 1974) (original combination)
 Kalidos elevatus Fischer-Piette & Salvat, 1966: synonym of Sitala elevata (Fischer-Piette & Salvat, 1966) (original combination)
 Kalidos huberi Thach, 2018: synonym of Kalidos chastellii (Deshayes in Férussac, 1832) (junior synonym)
 Kalidos tenebricus Fischer-Piette, Blanc, F. & Salvat, 1975: synonym of Kalidos anceyianus Fischer-Piette & Salvat, 1966 (junior synonym)
 Kalidos tulearensis Fischer-Piette & Salvat, 1966: synonym of Trochonanina tulearensis (Fischer-Piette & Salvat, 1966) (original combination)

References

 Robson, G. C. (1914). On a collection of land and freshwater Gastropoda from Madagascar, with descriptions of new genera and new species. Zoological Journal of the Linnean Society, 32: 375–389, pl. 35, figs. 1–6. London.
 Bank, R. (2017). Classification of the Recent terrestrial Gastropoda of the World. Last update: July 16th, 2017

External links 
 

Helicarionidae